Defending champion Jennifer Capriati defeated Martina Hingis in a rematch of the previous year's final, 4–6, 7–6(9–7), 6–2 to win the women's singles tennis title at the 2002 Australian Open. It was her second Australian Open title and her third and last major singles title overall. Capriati saved four championship points en route to the title.

This tournament marked the major debuts of future world No. 2 and two-time major champion Svetlana Kuznetsova, who lost to Iroda Tulyaganova in the second round, and future world No. 4 and US Open champion Samantha Stosur, who lost in the first round to Gréta Arn.

The final
In a repeat of the previous year's final, three-time former champion Hingis won the first set 6–4 having led 5–1 at one stage. Hingis then took a 4–0 lead in the second set, and held three championship points, but Capriati fought back to take the set into a tiebreaker. There Hingis held another championship point at 7–6, but Capriati saved it and eventually won the tiebreaker and set 9–7. Hingis then broke Capriati's serve in the third set to lead 2–1, but defending champion Capriati won the next five games to complete a 4–6, 7-6(9-7), 6-2 victory. In doing so she gained the record for the most championship points saved in a major final.

Seeds
The seeded players are listed below. Jennifer Capriati is the champion; others show the round in which they were eliminated.

Qualifying

Draw

Finals

Top half

Section 1

Section 2

Section 3

Section 4

Bottom half

Section 5

Section 6

Section 7

Section 8

External links
 2002 Australian Open – Women's draws and results at the International Tennis Federation

Women's singles
Australian Open (tennis) by year – Women's singles
2002 in Australian women's sport